The 2019 Howard Bison football team represented Howard University as a member Mid-Eastern Athletic Conference (MEAC) during the 2019 NCAA Division I FCS football season. The Bison were led by first-year head coach Ron Prince until he was placed on administrative leave prior to the team's November 9 game, with director of football operations Aaron Kelton named as interim head coach. Howard finished the season with an overall record of 2–10 and mark of 2–6 in conference play, tying for seventh place in the MEAC. The Bison played home games at William H. Greene Stadium.

Preseason

MEAC poll
In the MEAC preseason poll released on July 26, 2019, the Bison were predicted to finish in fourth place.

Preseason All–MEAC teams
The Bison had nine different players selected to the preseason all-MEAC teams.

First Team Offense

Caylin Newton – QB

Dedrick Parson – RB

Jequez Ezzard – WR

Kyle Anthony – WR

Second Team Offense

Malik Hyatt – TE

Second Team Defense

Marcellos Allison – DL

Zamon Robinson – DL

Tye Freeland – DB

Third Team Defense

Aaron Walker – DB

Dedrick Parson – RS

Schedule

Game summaries

at Maryland

at Youngstown State

Hampton

at Delaware State

Bethune–Cookman

at Harvard

Norfolk State

at North Carolina A&T

North Carolina Central

at South Carolina State

at Florida A&M

Morgan State

References

Howard
Howard Bison football seasons
Howard Bison football